Gay bashing is an attack, abuse, or assault committed against a person who is perceived by the aggressor to be gay, lesbian, bisexual, or transgender (LGBT). It includes both  violence against LGBT people and LGBT bullying. The term covers violence against and bullying of people who are LGBT, as well as non-LGBT people whom the attacker perceives to be LGBT. 

Physical gay bashings sometimes involve extreme violence or murder motivated by the victim's sexual orientation, gender identity, or gender expression.

LGBT youth are more likely to report bullying than non-LGBT youth, particularly in schools. Victims of LGBT bullying may feel unsafe, resulting in depression and anxiety, including increased rates of suicide and attempted suicide. LGBT students may try to pass as heterosexual to escape the bullying, leading to further stress and isolation from available supports. Support organizations exist in many countries to prevent LGBT bullying and support victims. Some jurisdictions have passed legislation against LGBT bullying and harassment.

Violence  

LGBT people frequently experience violence directed toward their sexuality, gender identity, or gender expression. This violence may be enacted by the state, as in laws prescribing punishment for homosexual acts, or by individuals. It may be motivated by biphobia, gayphobia, homophobia, lesbophobia, and transphobia. Influencing factors may be cultural, religious, or political mores and biases.

Bullying 

Bullying of LGBT people, particularly LGBT youth, involves intentional actions toward the victim, repeated negative actions by one or more people against another person, and an imbalance of physical or psychological power.

LGBT youth are more likely to report bullying than non-LGBT youth. In one study, boys who were bullied with taunts of being gay suffered more bullying and more negative effects compared with boys who were bullied with other categories of taunting. Some researchers suggest including youth questioning their sexuality in any research on LGBT bullying because they may be as susceptible to its effects as LGBT students.

See also 

 Abuse
 Anti-LGBT slogans
 Bash Back!
 Bullying
 Corrective rape
 Cyberbullying
 Day of Silence
 Hate crime
 School bullying
 Significant acts of violence against LGBT people
 Trans bashing
 Trust and safety issues in online dating services
 Violence against LGBT people

References

Further reading 

 Meyer, Doug (2015). Violence against Queer People: Race, Class, Gender, and the Persistence of Anti-LGBT Discrimination. Rutgers University Press.
 
 
 
 
 
 
 
 
 
 
 
 
 
 

Violence against LGBT people
LGBT and society
Sex- and gender-related slurs
Persecution of LGBT people
Abuse
LGBT terminology
Persecution
Bullying
Hate crimes